Alan Parker (5 May 1928 – 15 November 2012) was a British long-distance runner who competed in the 1952 Summer Olympics. He was born in Barrow-in-Furness.

References

External links
 

1928 births
2012 deaths
Sportspeople from Barrow-in-Furness
English male long-distance runners
Olympic athletes of Great Britain
Athletes (track and field) at the 1952 Summer Olympics